Vilayati Bhabhi ( "British Sister in Law") is an Indian Punjabi language television series that premiered from 13 January 2020 on Zee Punjabi. It starred Kanwarpreet Singh and Isha Gupta in the lead roles. It is an official remake of Zee Marathi's TV series Lagnachi Wife Weddingchi Bayku. It ended on 15 January 2021.

Plot 
Sandy and Emily both live in Canada. Sandy as an NRI man gets married to Emily who lives in Canada as well. Sandy who’s a loafer and doesn’t want to put more effort into his work. He gets back to his Village Punjab with her wife. When Sandy came back to his village and spend few months in Punjab India. The villager want him to go back to Canada with his wife and think that why he had gone to Canada for his desire and aim.

Cast 
 Isha Gupta as Emily
 Kanwarpreet Singh as Sandy
 Sushma Prashant
 Mandeep Mani
 Guru Sevak
 Damini Shetty
 Charanpreet Maan

Adaptations

References

External links 
 
 Vilayati Bhabhi at ZEE5

2020 Indian television series debuts
2021 Indian television series endings
Punjabi-language television shows
Zee Punjabi original programming